Secondhand Rapture is the debut studio album by American duo MS MR, released on May 14, 2013 by Columbia Records. The album was written and produced by MS MR with additional production and mixing done by Tom Elmhirst. The album features the singles "Hurricane", "Fantasy" and "Think of You". Secondhand Rapture peaked at No. 116 on the Billboard 200 and sold 3,500 copies during its first week.

Singles
 "Hurricane" was released as the first European single. The song was popular in Germany and made it to No. 38 on that country's singles chart. In April 2013, "Hurricane" was rereleased as the second international single from the album.
 "Fantasy" was released as the official lead single from the album. The music video was released on February 4, 2013. The single reached No. 77 on Australia's ARIA Charts.
 "Think of You" was released as the third single. The music video was released on February 4, 2013.

Critical reception

Secondhand Rapture garnered mixed reviews from music critics. At Metacritic, which assigns a normalized rating out of 100 to reviews from mainstream critics, the album received an average score of 60, based on 15 reviews.

Laurence Green, writing for MusicOMH, praised the album's warm production, melodies and consistency, declaring, "For all its rich fashionable stylings, Second Rapture is a pop album to its very core and wears the tag with pride". AllMusic's Heather Phares said, "MS MR concentrate on a sullen yet sultry mood for the bulk of Secondhand Rapture, and while that delivers several notable tracks -- "Fantasy" and "Head Is Not My Home" chief among them—at times it's almost too much. Still, the album's strongest tracks show that the duo has plenty of talent and potential". " Sal Cinquemani of Slant Magazine praised the album, noting that "MS MR's knack for durable hooks, in fact, is what keeps the album's gloomy goth-pop anchored".

Pitchfork contributor Laura Snapes described the band's sound as "brooding, rhythmically strong pop songs that fall halfway between the poutiness of Lana Del Rey and the hyperactive fizz of Haim", but criticized their "obsessively curated" strategy", inconsistent lyrical approach and deviations from their sonic template of "deep, thunderous rumblings, celestial twinkling, foggy shrouds, and the sweet clarity of a pastel dawn". Sasha Geffen of Consequence of Sound commended Plapinger's nuanced lyrical delivery and Hershenow's "rich orchestral palette", concluding that "Secondhand Rapture blurs the line between throwing up our hands in defeat and throwing them up in joy".

In popular culture
"Bones" was used in a promotional trailer for the third season of Game of Thrones in early 2013, and in the "What Becomes of the Broken-Hearted" episode of Pretty Little Liars, which aired February 12, 2013. "Hurricane" was featured in the 2018 film Extinction.

Track listing

Personnel
MS MR
 Lizzy Plapinger (MS)
 Max Hershenow (MR)

Additional personnel
 MS MR – art direction, design
 Anita Marisa Boriboon – art direction, design
 Tyler Kohloff – photography
 Lana Lackey – styling
 Laura Stiassini – hair and make-up
 Carmen Maria Traud – illustration

Charts

Release history

References

2013 debut albums
MS MR albums
Columbia Records albums